The Kilvey Hill transmitting station was originally built at the summit of Kilvey Hill in Swansea, Wales, by the BBC in 1967 as a relay for VHF and UHF television. VHF television came on air a few months before the UHF services. As built, the station did not radiate VHF FM radio, this was added later. Currently, the hill's transmitters cater for viewers and listeners in the Swansea and Neath Port Talbot area. The transmission station located on top of Kilvey Hill is owned and operated by Arqiva.

Freeview digital terrestrial TV was already available at low power from this transmitter before the digital switchover process began, with the first stage taking place on Wednesday 12 August 2009. The second stage was completed on Wednesday 9 September 2009, with the transmitter becoming the first in Wales to complete digital switchover. After the switchover process, analogue channels ceased broadcasting permanently and the Freeview power increased from 383 W ERP to 2 kW ERP, a 7 dB power increase.

Channels listed by frequency

Analogue television

December 1967 - 17 February 1968
Kilvey Hill provided BBC 405-line VHF television to the Neath and Port Talbot area which is strongly shielded by local hills from the Wenvoe transmitter just to the west of Cardiff. Kilvey Hill was a relay of the Wenvoe transmitter. Despite being sited at Swansea, no effort was made to provide the VHF TV signal to Swansea itself - the town was already deemed to be well served by Wenvoe.

17 February 1968 - 28 January 1972
A BBC R&D report details the coming of 625-line UHF television to the Kilvey Hill site. This again was with the station acting as an off-air relay of Wenvoe, which was (at that point) only transmitting BBC 2 (in colour) on 625-lines. This time, the northern parts of Swansea were intended to be covered by the signal as local hills (including Kilvey Hill itself) shielded those parts of the town from the UHF signal from Wenvoe.

28 January 1972 - 1 November 1982
BBC1 and HTV Wales came on air from Wenvoe in April 1970, but it was nearly two years later before Kilvey Hill started to relay those channels.

1 November 1982 - Second Quarter 1983
Channel 4 launched across the UK in 1982. Kilvey Hill (being in Wales) transmitted the S4C variant.

Second Quarter 1983 - 15 July 1997
405 line television was discontinued early, and from then onwards TV transmissions were on UHF only.

15 July 1997 - 15 November 1998
During 1997, Channel 5 gained an analogue channel from some transmitters and Kilvey Hill was one of them. The site radiated all five UK terrestrial analogue television services at 10 kW until digital switchover was completed on 9 September 2009.

Analogue and digital television

15 November 1998 - 12 August 2009
The initial rollout of digital television in the UK involved radiating the signals at low power in between the existing analogue channels. The apparent use of channels "21" and "22-" for muxes "C" and "2" respectively might look like a mistake, but is confirmed by OFCOM's site.

12 August 2009 - 9 September 2009
The UK's digital switchover commenced with Kilvey Hill on 12 August 2009. Analogue BBC2 Wales on channel 26 was first to close, and HTV Wales was moved from channel 23 to channel 26 for its last month of service. With it went Mux 1 from channel 25- to be replaced by the new BBC A mux which started up in 64-QAM and at full power (i.e. 2 kW) on channel 23 which had just been vacated in the shuffle.

Digital television

9 September 2009 - 17 Jul 2019
The remaining analogue TV services were closed down, the digital multiplexes took over their original frequencies (and a few new ones) with a power increase and a move to 64-QAM encoding. The service covers Swansea, Neath Port Talbot, Bridgend, Carmarthenshire, Pembrokeshire, and parts of South Wales including Cowbridge and the Vale of Glamorgan where the Wenvoe Transmitters’ signals are shielded by hills.

17 Jul 2019 - present
Services have moved to different frequencies.

Analogue radio (VHF FM)

30 September 1974 - Early 1980s
The first FM radio from the site was Wales' first independent radio station, Swansea Sound.

Early 1980s - 1989
Swansea Sound changed frequency to 96.4 MHz as required by a new bandplan for Band II broadcasting which placed BBC stations below 96 MHz and Independent Local Radio stations above that. The band limit was 98 MHz at that point. BBC Radio 2, BBC Radio 3 and BBC Radio Cymru commenced from the site sometime before 1988 as the BBC's Service Area map of 1988 shows.

1989 - 30 September 1995
The 1988 bandplan for Band II raised the upper limit for broadcasting to 100 MHz and Radio 1 gained its own frequency.

30 September 1995 - 1997
Swansea Sound changed its name first to "96.4 Sound Wave" then (quickly) to 96.4 The Wave.

1997 - present
Classic FM came on air in 1997, the other new services have joined at various times since then. Radio Cymru has moved to 104.2 MHz with BBC Radio Wales taking over the vacated 93.9 MHz slot.

Digital radio (DAB)

The digital radio signal covers Swansea, Neath Port Talbot, Bridgend, Carmarthenshire, Pembrokeshire, and parts of South Wales including Cowbridge and the Vale of Glamorgan where the Wenvoe Transmitters’ signals are shielded by hills.

References

External links
Kilvey Hill transmitter info
The Transmission Gallery: Kilvey Hill

Transmitter sites in Wales
Wenvoe VHF 405-line Transmitter Group
Wenvoe UHF 625-line Transmitter Group
Mass media and culture in Swansea
Media and culture in Neath Port Talbot
1967 establishments in Wales
Towers completed in 1967